William E. Kapelle (born in Baldwin City, Kansas) is a medieval historian at Brandeis University in Waltham, Massachusetts.  He received his B.A at the University of Kansas in 1965, and his M.A. in 1970.  Kapelle received his doctorate at the University of Massachusetts - Amherst, and has taught at Brandeis University for more than twenty years.

He is noted for the argument, among others, that the North of England was not really brought under Norman control until the reign of Henry I.

Major publications
The Norman Conquest of the North: The Region and Its Transformation, 1000-1135 (University of North Carolina Press, 1980), .
The Purpose of Domesday Book: a Quandary
Domesday Book: F. W. Maitland and His Successors (1989)
 Fraser Coles Fan Book (1993)

External links
 Faculty page

21st-century American historians
21st-century American male writers
Year of birth missing (living people)
University of Kansas alumni
Brandeis University faculty
Living people
People from Baldwin City, Kansas
American male non-fiction writers